O6-alkylguanine DNA alkyltransferase II (O6 AGT II) previously known as O6 Guanine transferase (ogt) is a bacterial protein that is involved in DNA repair together with Ada ( also known as O6 AGT I).

Like AGT I, AGT II is responsible for the removal of alkyl groups from O6-alkyl guanine, O4-alkyl thymine and alkyl phosphotriester in the sugar-phosphate backbone of DNA.  AGT II shows a greater preference for O4-alkyl thymine than O6-alkyl guanine and alkyl phosphotriester.

Unlike Ada, AGT II is expressed constitutively in cells.  Therefore, AGT II will repair alkylated DNA adducts even before Ada is fully induced. AGT II is similar to Ada in its suicide inactivation in that AGT II transfers the alkyl group to a cysteine residue in its own structure, thereby inactivating itself.  The human equivalent of AGT II is O6-alkylguanine DNA alkyltransferase, a protein that in humans is encoded by the O6-methylguanine DNA methyltransferase (MGMT) gene. In humans, O6-alkylguanine DNA alkyltransferase preferentially removes alkyl groups from O6-alkyl guanine rather than from O6–alkyl thymine.

References 

DNA repair